The Murulla rail accident involved the collision of the Sydney-bound Northern Mail with runaway goods wagons near Murrurundi, New South Wales, in the Upper Hunter Valley on 13 September 1926; 26 persons died. A goods train had become divided and the attempts of the train crew to reunite the portions resulted in 12 vehicles running away down a steep gradient, and colliding with the approaching mail train. This was the worst accident on the New South Wales rail network until the Granville railway disaster in 1977.

The events 
The signal box at Murulla controlled a loop line for trains to pass on a single-line railway;  no other connections were at the location. Electric Train Staff operated between Wingen and Murulla and Electric Tablet operated between Murulla and Blandford.

Train number 62, a southbound goods train, comprised a standard goods engine hauling 34 wagons and a brake van were to pass through Murulla on the main line. Another goods train, number 95, working in the opposing direction, had entered the loop line and was waiting for number  62 to pass. Number 62 had a length of 951 feet (290 m) and a load of 746 tons (758 t). All vehicles were fitted with Westinghouse air brakes.

The train slowed at Murulla signalbox for the exchange of the single-line tokens, and as the train staff for the onward section was received, the driver of number  62 put on steam. The shock resulted in the train becoming divided, with the rear 12 vehicles separating from the main train. This was later attributed to the failure of a drawhook. The division of the train was noticed by the driver and both portions of the train were safely brought to a stand.

Both portions of the train were verified to be within the clearance points of the loop line, so train number  95 was permitted to depart.

The detached portion of number  62 consisted of 12 vehicles, and its length 331 feet with a weight of 264 tons. Handbrakes were applied to these vehicles. The train staff in the possession of the engine crew apparently was returned to the instrument in the signal box at this time, and  all vehicles were within the confines of the home signals.

After a number of attempts to fit a tailrope, the brake van had been shunted back, foul of the clearance point for the loop line. The two opposing vehicles at the separation were finally hitched with a single wire rope connection, but the airbrake hoses could not be connected. The signalman then requested that the train be brought forward so that it was clear of the clearance point so as to permit the approaching southbound number  8 mail train to pass through the loop.

The guard of number  62 released the handbrakes on the rear portion, leaving it unbraked, and the driver went forward to his engine. When he started the train, the tailrope broke and the rear portion began to run back down the grade towards Blandford, coming into collision with the approaching mail train just beyond the Up Distant signal. The collision resulted in the death of 26 persons. (Gunn has 27 fatalities.)

Coronial inquest 
Following the disaster, a coronial inquest was held at Murrurundi, with evidence being taken over 8 days. On 9 October 1926, the district coroner committed the driver and guard of the goods train for trial. He noted that no pin was in the train's guard's brake van to enable the two portions of the train to be coupled in accordance with regulations. Had the portions been properly coupled, the Westinghouse brake pipe hoses could have been connected so that in the event of a further break-away, the brakes on the rear portion would have been automatically applied. In the absence of that pin, essential principles of safe working had been overlooked.

Criminal court proceedings 
On 6 December, the driver and guard appeared at the Central Criminal Court, charged with felonious slaying one of the mail train's passengers. The crown prosecutor alleged, "if the accused failed to link up the air brakes when the appliances were there, they were guilty of gross negligence."

In his summing up, Mr Justice Ferguson said, "the charge of manslaughter could be established only if the crown proved gross negligence, criminal in character, and deserving of punishment". On 8 December, the two men were acquitted.

References

1926 in Australia
Railway accidents in 1926
Railway accidents and incidents in New South Wales
Runaway train disasters
Rail transport in the Hunter Region
1920s in New South Wales
Train collisions in Australia
September 1926 events
1925 disasters in Australia